Camponotus fallax is a species of ant belonging to the family Formicidae.

It is native to Europe and Northern America.

References

fallax
Taxa named by William Nylander (botanist)
Insects described in 1856